RedToL, or Red Algal Tree of Life, is part of the collaborative National Science Foundation Assembling the Tree of Life activity (AToL), funded through the Division of Environmental Biology, Directorate for Biological Sciences. The overall goal of AToL is to resolve evolutionary relationships for large groups of organisms throughout the history of life, with the research often involving large teams working across institutions and disciplines.  Investigators are typically supported for projects in data acquisition, analysis, algorithm development and dissemination in computational phylogenetics and phyloinformatics.

The Phylogenetic and Genomic Approaches to Reconstructing the Red Algal Tree of Life focus on the Rhodophyta (red algae), one of the most ancient eukaryotic phyla with fossil evidence for Bangiales stretching back 1.2 billion years. Red algae are not only key members of marine and freshwater aquatic environments but they are sources for important human foods such as dulse and sushi wrap, and have a multitude of pharmaceutical and industrial uses (e.g., agarose and carrageenans). Perhaps most important is the role red algae played in symbiogenesis. A red alga was the ancient (>1 billion years ago) donor of the plastid in chlorophyll c-containing algae (heterokonta or stramenopiles) that rose to prominence in marine ecosystems after the end of Permian with groups such as diatoms currently providing ca. 20% of global fixed carbon.

Aims
The aims of RedToL are: 1) reconstruct a robust phylogeny of 471 red algal species using a concatenated dataset of 2 nuclear, 4 plastid, and 2 mitochondrial encoded gene markers; 2) sequence plastid genomes and generate transcriptome databases for 16 key taxa that represent the phylogenetic (e.g., class- and order-level) breadth of the red algae, 3) make freely available red algal multi-gene and genome data via release to GenBank and a project-specific web site.  The outreach and student mentoring program is an important component of the RedToL initiative.

The 471 chosen species from 294 genera represent the diversity of ca. 6,000 red algal species (i.e., ca. 35% of all red algal genera will be included, which represent all extant orders). The robust phylogenetic framework resulting from this study is the basis for a comprehensive taxonomic revision of the red algae and provides the basis for interpreting key innovations during red algal evolution. Because the chosen marker genes are shared across different Assembling the Tree of Life (AToL) projects, it will provide a common framework for a future comprehensive eukaryotic tree. Complete plastid genome and transcriptome data from 16 major red algal taxa will provide a genome inventory to facilitate understanding of red algal evolution, as well as provide the basis for phylogenetic analyses using a rich set (i.e., hundreds) of vertically inherited genes. The genome data will specifically test the relationships among the major classes and orders of red algae. The RedToL team members come from eight institutions including two foreign collaborators and fifteen advisory board members and represent the most prominent active national and international red algal specialists from different generations who use different methods (from taxonomy to phylogenomics) to enhance understanding of red algal biology.

External links
Home page of RedToL
NSF AtoL home page
Video clips of RedToL outreach initiatives
NSF Directorate of Biological Sciences

Biological evolution
Phylogenetics
Evolutionary biology
Red algae